The Gin Bolero Plus is a South Korean single-place, paraglider that was designed by Gin Seok Song and produced by Gin Gliders of Yongin. It is now out of production.

Design and development
The Bolero Plus was designed as an intermediate glider. The models are each named for their relative size.

Variants
Bolero Plus XS
Extra small-sized model for light pilots. The glider model is DHV 1 certified.
Bolero Plus S
Small-sized model for lighter pilots. The glider model is DHV 1 certified.
Bolero Plus M
Mid-sized model for medium-weight pilots. The glider model is DHV 1 certified.
Bolero Plus L
Large-sized model for heavier pilots. The glider model is DHV 1 certified.
Bolero Plus XL
Extra large-sized model for much heavier pilots. The glider model is DHV 1 certified.

Specifications (Bolero Plus L)

References

Bolero
Paragliders